Narince may refer to:

 Narince (grape), a variety of grape used in Turkish winemaking
 Narince, Bozyazı, a village in Bozyazı district of Mersin Province, Turkey
 Narince, Kahta, a village in the district of Kahta, Adıyaman Province, Turkey